The Société de Véhicules Automobiles de Batilly (SoVAB) is a subsidiary of the French car manufacturer Renault, created in 1980 to operate the light commercial vehicle plant located at Batilly.

History
The project to create a new facility at Batilly, Meurthe-et-Moselle, was begun by Renault's subsidiary Saviem in 1972. It was continued when Saviem was merged with Berliet to form Renault Véhicules Industriels (RVI). The factory was constructed between 1976 and 1979. In 1980 Renault took from its subsidiary RVI a 25% stake of the factory's capital to form SOVAB. At the same year the factory started to manufacture the first-generation Master. The first-generation Trafic was introduced in 1981 and the Renault B in 1982. During the following years Renault collaborated with General Motors and in 1997, they launched the Master II which was also marketed as Opel Movano. From 1995 onwards the Batilly factory became the sole assembler of the Trafic I, after Chausson's Creil factory was closed down. The model was discontinued in 2000. Renault kept Batilly when sold RVI to Volvo in 2001. In 2010 was introduced the Master III.

Facilities
The SOVAB complex comprises 101 hectares of which 181,838 m2 are covered. There is a single production line. The vehicles assembled by the company are sold by Renault, Opel, Vauxhall, Nissan and Renault Trucks. On 13 June 2013, SoVAB produced its 2,000,000th unit.

Within SOVAB there is also a Renault Tech workshop which has 6,800 m2 and employs 72 people.

Current Vehicles manufactured

 Renault Master III (2010−present)

Former Vehicles manufactured
 Renault Master/Renault Trucks B series/Renault Trucks Messenger  (1980−1997)
 Renault Trafic (1981−2000)
 Renault Master II/Renault Trucks Mascott (1997−2010)

References

Renault
Vehicle manufacturing companies established in 1980
1980 establishments in France
Motor vehicle assembly plants in France